Prisoner of the Mountains (Kavkazskiy plennik), also known as Prisoner of the Caucasus, is a 1996 Russian war drama film directed by Sergei Bodrov and written by Bodrov, Arif Aliyev and Boris Giller. The film is based on the 1872 Caucasian War-era short story "The Prisoner in the Caucasus" by the classic Russian writer Leo Tolstoy.

Prisoner of the Mountains was awarded a Crystal Globe at the 1996 Karlovy Vary International Film Festival, and the same year was nominated for an Academy Award for Best Foreign Language Film (Russia) and a Golden Globe Award for Best Foreign Language Film (Russia). It also received generally positive  critic reviews.

This film illustrates the conflicting views between traditional Chechen culture and Russian warfare through the use of soundtrack, costuming, and arms. The personal confrontation between two Russian soldiers and their Chechen captors is the main theme of the film, which was shot in the mountains of Dagestan (mostly in the aul of Ritcha, whose inhabitants are mentioned in the film's credits), a short distance away from the then-ongoing First Chechen War.

The First Chechen war was to establish independence from Russia. Bodrov creates contrasting views between these two cultures after two Russian soldiers are captured in exchange for the son of a Chechen's father. This movie revolved around the strife between the people who are caught in the rivalry between the Chechens and Russians. A common theme of Revenge. The viewer confronts from the importance of human conflict and war from the very beginning [2]

Chechen culture 
The Chechen culture is depicted through multiple scenes when Sasha and Vanya (the two Russian soldiers) are held captive. Bodrov adds to the cinematography of the culture with a scene of the villages and Chechen native music playing and the costumes of the Chechen villagers. The viewer also sees scenes of the villages taking care of animals, dancing, and doing everyday activities.

Cast
 Oleg Menshikov – Sasha
 Sergei Bodrov Jr. – Ivan (Vanya) Zhilin
 Dzhemal Sikharulidze – Abdul-Murat
 Susanna Mekhralieva – Dina
 Aleksandr Bureev – Hasan
 Valentina Fedotova – Ivan's mother
 Aleksei Zharkov – Maslov

Plot
A group of Russian soldiers is ambushed by rebels in the Chechen mountains and the two survivors are taken prisoner by an old man Abdul Murat, who wants to swap them for his son held by the Russians. The two prisoners cope with the situation in very different ways, as the war-hardened and cynical sergeant Sasha (Oleg Menshikov) works to escape while the young and naive conscript Vanya (Sergei Bodrov, Jr.) tries to make friends with his captors and falls in love with Abdul's daughter Dina.

Vanya is portrayed as a very vulnerable and "interesting" soldier as he is unable to kill. In a specific scene Sasha expresses his strife and anger with Vanya to “come back and kill the Chechens.”  Vanya’s response was very soft because he desires to not kill the people, especially after falling in love with Dina. Vanya’s mother makes an appearance to the patriarch of the village to sympathize with him about his captured son in order to get Vanya back.  His response is coldhearted as he refuses to let him go.  In another scene that defines Vanya’s masculinity, he is put up against a Chechen fighter. In Hollywood a viewer could almost predict the outcome in which the underdog would make an impressive win against the talented fighter.  Although, this is not shown because the fighter laughs at Vanya and sends him away.(3)

Sasha is a very successful, confident soldier. At first he is cold towards Vanya but eventually teams up in order to form an escape. Before the escape, Sasha breaks down sobbing in a very  long, yet poetic scene. The cinematography is focused on his facial expressions defining every detail.  The sound that goes along with this scene is a Russian war song from the Second World War. This scene contrasts the point that Sasha is a big and strong sergeant, but breaks down at the thought of going back to the homeland. This brings vulnerability between Vanya and Sasha.Not long after this scene, Sasha leads the escape as he kills two people along the way.  One was a guard that was a capture as well and one that was a shepherd. During these scenes we are shown the insensitivity of Sasha towards death.(3)

After an escape attempt fails, Bodrov expresses complete irony in the narrative in which it is Vanya’s fault that Sasha was killed because he fired the gun that had them found.(2) Sasha takes the blame for the deaths to Abdul and is taken to be executed.

After Abdul's son is killed during an escape attempt, Abdul goes to execute Vanya in return, only to find that he has been released by Dina. Dina at first refused to let him go but promised a “proper burial”. Ironically as Dina caves in and lets him go Vanya does not run. This is because he tries protecting Dina from her father for never forgiving her for letting Vanya go.(3) When Abdul walks him out of the village to execute him, he instead fires his rifle over Vanya's head and walks away, leaving him. Vanya sets off back to the Russian lines, and sees a helicopter squadron. He tries to flag them down, only to realize that they have been sent to destroy the village he and Sasha were imprisoned in. The movie ends with a closing monologue from Vanya (Translated as follows):

"After the imprisonment, They held me in a hospital for two weeks, and then sent me home. On the train, Mother cried all the way, and told a fellow passenger how fortunate she was. I always wish I could see the people I grew to love in my dreams, whom I will never see again. But I just can't get their faces to come to me."

The end of the movie suggests the most ironic part of the movie and that war is a never-ending series of unfortunate events which is uncharitable to everyone involved.(4)

Bodrov 
Bodrov took an analysis of the original story “The Prisoner in the Caucasus”. Prisoner in the Caucasus was a more Pro-Russian film. Bodrov filmed this movie to be more universal to appeal to the audience better. Bodrov read this short story when he was a child and it impressed him. Bodrov dramatizes the film by giving more detail about a second soldier. In the original story the second prisoner was not mentioned many times. Bodrov even claims to the ‘New York Times’ that this movie started peace between the two countries as the movie was shown on a Sunday to President Yeltsin and the peace process started on Monday. Overall, Bodrov made the film more ironic and gave a sense of realism at the same time.(4)

Reception

Awards
Awards:
European Film Award – Outstanding Single Achievement
Karlovy Vary International Film Festival – Award of Ecumenical Jury
Karlovy Vary International Film Festival – Crystal Globe
Nika Awards – Best Actor
Nika Awards – Best Director
Nika Awards – Best Film
Nika Awards – Best Screenplay

Nominations:
Academy Award – Best Foreign Language Film (Russia)
Golden Globe Award – Best Foreign Language Film (Russia)
Nika Awards – Best Cinematographer
Nika Awards – Best Sound Editing
Satellite Awards – Best Motion Picture (Foreign Language)

Ratings
Prisoner of the Mountains  has an approval rating of 88% on review aggregator website Rotten Tomatoes, based on 25 reviews, and an average rating of 7.63/10.

See also
 List of submissions to the 69th Academy Awards for Best Foreign Language Film
 List of Russian submissions for the Academy Award for Best Foreign Language Film

References

External links

1996 films
Films directed by Sergei Bodrov
1990s war drama films
Anti-war films
Chechen wars films
Chechen-language films
Crystal Globe winners
Films based on short fiction
Films based on works by Leo Tolstoy
Films set in Russia
Films shot in the North Caucasus
Films shot in Kazakhstan
Golden Leopard winners
Kazakhstani war drama films
Military of Russia in films
Prisoner of war films
1990s Russian-language films
1990s Turkish-language films
Russian war drama films
Films scored by Leonid Desyatnikov
1990s political films
1996 drama films